Essen-Borbeck Süd is a railway station in Essen, North Rhine-Westphalia, Germany. The station is located on the Essen–Bottrop railway and is served by S-Bahn services operated by DB Regio.

Tram service
 103
 105

References

S9 (Rhine-Ruhr S-Bahn)
Rhine-Ruhr S-Bahn stations
Borbeck Sud